Salvadora Medina Onrubia (pen name: Dr. Brea; March 23, 1894July 21, 1972) was an Argentine storyteller, poet, anarchist and feminist.

Biography
Salvadora Medina Onrubia was born March 23, 1894, in La Plata, Buenos Aires Province. At the age of 15, she embraced the cause of the young anarchist from Russia, Simón Radowitzky, After and began a friendship with him by correspondence.

In February 1912, a month before Medina's 18th birthday, her first child, Carlos "Pitón", was born. In 1913, she began her literary activity in Gualeguay and in the Buenos Aires media, including at the magazine Fray Mocho. In the middle of that year, she moved from Entre Ríos to the City of Buenos Aires and began working for the anarchist newspaper, La Protesta. Soon after, she met Natalio Botana, a young journalist who collaborated with the magazine P.B.T. Natalio gave his surname to Salvadora's son and together they had three more children: Helvio Ildefonso, Jaime Alberto and Georgina Nicolasa. In 1919, Medina married Botana, after the birth of her youngest daughter. Botana had established the newspaper Crítica, which Medina directed between 1946 and 1951 after her husband's death.

She was a contributor to La Protesta, Fray Mocho, and the newspaper, Crítica. In this publication, she wrote under the pseudonym "Dr. Brea". She was the author of several dramatic pieces, such as Almafuerte, La solución (The solution), Las decentradas, and Un hombre y su vida (A man and his life). Her books of poetry include El misal de mi yoga (The Missal of My Yoga) and La rueca milagrosa (The Miraculous Spinning Wheel). She was the author of single novel, Akasha and two books of short stories, El libro humilde y doliente (The humble and suffering book) and El vaso intacto y otros cuentos (The intact glass and other stories). Medina was a promoter of children's theater for children.

Medina died July 21, 1972, in Buenos Aires, leaving behind an unpublished book, Los mil claveles colorados (A thousand red carnations). The book was edited together with ¡Arroja la bomba! Salvadora Medina Onrubia y el feminismo anarco, by Vanina Escales.

Selected works
Almafuerte
La solución
Las decentradas
Un hombre y su vida
El misal de mi yoga
La rueca milagrosa
Akasha
El libro humilde y doliente
El vaso intacto y otros cuentos

References

1894 births
1972 deaths
20th-century Argentine writers
20th-century Argentine women writers
20th-century Argentine poets
20th-century Argentine novelists
20th-century Argentine short story writers
20th-century pseudonymous writers
Argentine anarchists
Argentine feminists
Argentine women novelists
Argentine women poets
Argentine women short story writers
People from La Plata
Pseudonymous women writers
Storytellers
Writers from Buenos Aires